The XIX Sens is a series of Swiss single-place paragliders, that was designed by Michi Kobler and produced by XIX GmbH of Kronbühl in the mid-2000s. It is now out of production.

Design and development
The Sens was designed as a competition performance glider. The design progressed through several generations of models, each improving on the last. The models are each named for their relative size.

The Sens-C3 version was introduced in 2003 to replace the Sens 2.

Variants
Sens-C3 S
Small-sized model for lighter pilots. The glider model is Deutscher Hängegleiterverband e.V. (DHV) certified.
Sens-C3 M
Mid-sized model for medium-weight pilots. The glider model is DHV certified.
Sens-C3 L
Large-sized model for heavier pilots. The glider model is DHV certified.

Specifications (Sens-C3 M)

References

Sens
Paragliders